Rancho San Carlos may refer to:

 Rancho San Carlos de Jonata, a Mexican land grant in present-day Santa Barbara County, California, United States
 Santa Lucia Preserve, Monterey County, California, United States, formerly known as Rancho San Carlos
 Rancho San Carlos, an estate at San Carlos Nuevo Guaymas, a beachfront subdivision in Guayamas, Sonora, Mexico
 Rancho Potrero de San Carlos, a Mexican land grant in present-day Monterey County, California, United States